Dante Tessieri was an Argentine scientist born in the late nineteenth century. He worked in the fields of physics, electricity and mathematics. Tesssiery wrote a book, "La Relatividad General ante la prueba Suprema", disagreeing with Albert Einstein's general relativity theory. In the book, Dante Tessieri uses the alias "Galileo".

His Life 
Not much of his life is known. He was born between 1850 and 1875 and died between 1920 and 1935. Tessieri wrote articles for magazines such as the "Revista de Obras Publicas (Magazine of Public Inventions). In 1904 he published an article on improving the efficiency of fans by adding electric motors.

Tessieri was head of the Freemasons in Argentina through which he associated with some of the most influential people in the country.

External Sources
"La Relatividad General ante la prueba Suprema", (Argentine National Congress Library )

20th-century Argentine physicists